Daraja Mbili is an administrative ward of the Arusha District in the Arusha Region of Tanzania. Per the 2012 census, its population is 19,491.

References

Wards of Arusha City
Wards of Arusha Region